"Let It Go" is a song by English singer-songwriter James Bay. It was released in Europe on 15 September 2014 through Republic Records as the first single from Bay's second extended play of the same name. It was included on Bay's debut studio album Chaos and the Calm (2014). The song was written by Bay with Paul Barry and produced by Jacquire King. The Let It Go EP was released prior on 3 May 2014.

The song was re-released in March 2015 after "Hold Back the River" and in July 2015, has peaked at number 10 on the UK Singles Chart, beating its previous peak of 62 on 27 September 2014. In May 2015, "Let It Go" peaked at number 8 in Australia, whilst in New Zealand, the song debuted on June 15, 2015, at number 31, before climbing to number 24 the following week. A week after that, the song entered the top 10 of the chart, peaking at number 10. "Let It Go" is Bay's first song to chart on the Billboard Hot 100, reaching number 16. A remix by Jack Steadman was released in 2015.

Usage in media
"Let It Go" was featured in the episode "For the Girl Who Has Everything" of the American TV series Supergirl, on the episode "Let Her Go" (season 6) of the TV series The Vampire Diaries, and the episode "Doubt Truth to Be a Liar" of the TV series The Royals season 2 and Remember Me by Allen Coulter. The song was also featured in the episode "The Great Pretender" on season 11 of Grey's Anatomy. The song was featured in chapter two of  Jane the Virgin.

Music video
A music video to accompany the release of "Let It Go" was first released onto YouTube on 23 March 2015 at a total length of four minutes and eighteen seconds.

Critical reception
Gregory Robson of AbsolutePunk said "Let It Go" was "a rising current of despondency, heartache and powerhouse vocals. Arguably one of the year's most heart-rendering songs, "Let it Go" is also the clearest example of who exactly Bay is, that is, supple instrumentation, gauzy textures and that ageless croon."

Charts

Weekly charts

Year-end charts

Decade-end charts

Certifications

Release history

References

2014 songs
2014 debut singles
2010s ballads
Republic Records singles
Song recordings produced by Jacquire King
Songs written by Paul Barry (songwriter)
Songs written by James Bay (singer)
Rock ballads
James Bay (singer) songs